The Chief Engraver of the United States Mint is the highest staff member at the United States Mint.

The Chief Engraver is the person in charge of coin design and engraving of dies at all four United States Mints: Philadelphia, Denver, San Francisco and West Point. The position was created by Congress with the Coinage Act of 1792, and placed within the Department of Treasury that produces circulating coinage for the United States. In 1990 after the resignation of Elizabeth Jones, the post of Chief Engraver was left vacant, and in 1996, with Public Law 104-208, was abolished  by Congress.

On February 3, 2009, Mint Director Edmund C. Moy, appointed John Mercanti to the position of Chief Engraver, with duties and prerogatives determined by the Mint’s Office of Public Affairs. The appointment was not a restoration of the original congressionally approved office, but a temporary promotion, renewable annually for one officeholder for no more than five years. Following Mercanti's retirement in 2010, the post remained vacant until February 2019, when Joseph Menna was appointed to the position.

List of Chief Engravers

References